Lakhdaria,  is a town in northern Algeria, in the Bouïra Province. It is located 50 miles (75 km) south east of Algiers. It is surrounded by the Kabylie mountains, and by a 3 miles long river named oued Isser, passing by rocky mountains called the grottoes of Lakhdaira.

History
The town was named Palestro when it was founded in 1860, it was named in honour of the Franco-Piedmontese victory over Austria at Palestro in 1859 during the Second Italian War of Independence. It was renamed Lakhdaria after Algerian independence in honour of Mokrani Rabah Lakhdar, known as Si Lakhdar, a senior FLN leader during the Algerian War.

Population
The population is now around 59 009 people. Farming, construction and transportation are the main sources of employment of the local population. Some residents also commute to Algiers for work.
The city is very busy, people like to do shopping and meeting in coffee shops and mosques.

Agriculture
Agriculture prevails in the area, especially vegetables and olive trees on family farms, many located at the bottom of the mountains that surround the area.

Industry
A telecommunication site is located in East of Lakhdaria that includes huge TV transmitters and receivers that is used by the Algerian television.

References

Populated places in Bouïra Province
Populated places established in 1860
Bouïra Province